Corporal technician is a rank in the Pakistan Air Force and a former rank in the British Royal Air Force, below senior technician and above junior technician. It is equivalent to the Pakistan Army's naik and the Pakistan Navy's leading rate. The British rank, which was only held by airmen in technical trades (with others keeping the rank of corporal), existed between 1950 and 1964. British corporal technicians wore two inverted chevrons to distinguish their trade rank.

Pakistan Air Force ranks
Former military ranks of the Royal Air Force